List of films on which William Kennedy Dickson has worked.

External links 
 

Male actor filmographies
Director filmographies
British filmographies
Scottish filmographies
Silent film directors